Mars Hill is a census-designated place (CDP) comprising the main village within the town of Mars Hill in Aroostook County, Maine, United States. The population of the CDP was 980 at the 2010 census, out of a population of 1,493 for the entire town. Prior to 2010, the village was part of the Mars Hill-Blaine CDP.

Geography
The Mars Hill CDP is located near the southwest corner of the town of Mars Hill, bordered by the town and CDP of Blaine to the south. U.S. Route 1 runs through the center of the CDP, leading northwest  to Presque Isle and south  to Houlton. U.S. Route 1A meets Route 1 at the center of the CDP and leads north  to Fort Fairfield, eventually rejoining Route 1 in Van Buren.

Demographics

References

Census-designated places in Maine
Census-designated places in Aroostook County, Maine